The following is the standings of the 2007–08 Azadegan League football season.

Standings

Group 1

Group 2

Top goal scorers

15
  Mohammad Parvin (Steel Azin)

Group A 

15
  Mohammad Parvin (Steel Azin)
11
  Mohammad Pourmand (Moghavemat Shiraz)
10
  Hadi Norouzi (Damash)
9
  Abbas Assadi (Shahrdari Bandar Abbas)
  Ghasem Salmani (Shahin Ahvaz)
8
  Ali Karimi (Sorkhpooshan)
  Jahangir Asgari (Niroye Zamini)
7
  Iman Razaghirad (Steel Azin)
  Ali Zadali (Payam Mashhad)
  Asghar Rameshgar (Teraktor Sazi)

Group B

13
  Behnam Beyranvand (Tarbiat Yazd)
9
  Mobin Derakhshan (Etka)
8
  Mohammad Azizi (Mes Rafsanjan)
7
  Mohammadali Hamzeie (Sepahan Novin)
  Esmaeil Alishirazi (Etka)
  Hadi Khodadadi (Nassaji)
6
  Milad Davoudi (Mes Rafsanjan)
  Mohammad Ghazi (Foolad)

Semifinals and final

Play Off

Payam Mashhad promoted to 2008–09 Persian Gulf Cup

Sepahan Novin promoted to 2008–09 Persian Gulf Cup.

Final

(Sepahan Novin did not show up, Payam awarded championship 2007-08)

June 2008
Sepahan Officials tried to show that Sepahan Novin is an independent from Sepahan and changed the board of directors of Sepahan Novin, which was not accepted by IRIFF, so Foolad F.C. promoted to 2008–09 Persian Gulf Cup.

July 2008
Number of teams increased to 28 teams. Homa, Machine Sazi, Shahin Ahvaz, Shemushack still remain in 2008–09 Azadegan League.

References
Azadegan League Statistics
Lig1.ir
League 1 Program Website

Azadegan League seasons
Iran
2007–08 in Iranian football leagues